Mark Charles Casey (born 9 October 1982) is a Scottish former professional footballer.

Career
Casey began his career with Celtic, appearing for the under-18 and under-21 side before joining Portsmouth in July 2001.
Casey failed to make a competitive first team appearance for Pompey, and moved on loan to St Patrick's Athletic in March 2004.

Casey left Portsmouth in May 2005, and returned to Scotland to sign for Ayr United. He spent two and a half years with Ayr, before leaving the club in January 2008 due to work commitments, and signing for junior side Glenafton Athletic.

He returned to the senior game 8 months later, joining Albion Rovers. He was injured on his debut, and left the club a short time after. He spent the next year out of the game, before appearing at Clyde's open trials in July 2009, and earned himself a one-year contract. He left the club after 6 months in December 2009. In January 2010 he signed for
Bellshill Athletic.

Personal life
Casey is the son of former Celtic player Jim Casey. In November 2008, Casey appeared in court after driving whilst being three times over the drink limit, despite already being banned from the road. He was jailed for two and a half months.

References

External links

Living people
1982 births
Footballers from Glasgow
Scottish footballers
Celtic F.C. players
Portsmouth F.C. players
St Patrick's Athletic F.C. players
Ayr United F.C. players
Albion Rovers F.C. players
Clyde F.C. players
Scottish Football League players
League of Ireland players
Association football defenders
Bellshill Athletic F.C. players
Glenafton Athletic F.C. players